San Gabriel Dam is a rock-fill dam on the San Gabriel River in Los Angeles County, California, within the Angeles National Forest. It is located directly upstream from the Morris Dam. The dam provides flood control, groundwater recharge flows and hydroelectricity for the heavily populated San Gabriel Valley in the Greater Los Angeles metropolitan area.

History

To be named the San Gabriel Forks Dam, the project was canceled by the State Engineer after having convened an inquiry to investigate problems which were occurring at San Gabriel Dam site, including a landslide that destroyed a large portion of the construction site, in early November 1929. The inquiry panel concluded and issued a report to the State Engineer stating that the proposed dam "cannot be constructed without creating a menace to life and property."

The cost of San Gabriel No. 1 was greatly understated, creating a scandal; in context with the Great Depression, the Los Angeles Times observed that "it is not now necessary to gamble $26 million on a [troubled and wasteful agency]". The bond measure necessary for financing of the project was defeated by a narrow margin of 52 to 48 percent. As a result, the city turned to the federal Public Works Administration for money to complete the project.

The San Gabriel No. 1 dam was to be made of rock-fill, which provides greater seismic stability.

In early 1938, before the dam was finished, Southern California was hit by record floods. The heaviest rains fell in the San Gabriel Mountains, swelling the San Gabriel River; on the night of March 2–3, 1938 a flood of  poured out of the mountains and into San Gabriel Reservoir.

Water management
Water stored behind San Gabriel Dam is an important source for groundwater recharge during the dry season of April through October. Water from San Gabriel, Cogswell and Morris Dams is released gradually through the dry months to spreading grounds at San Gabriel Canyon (Azusa) and Peck Basin (near Arcadia), where it percolates into the local groundwater basin.

The  reservoir stores  of water when full, creating one of Southern California's largest instream reservoirs. This is 17% less than the original capacity of  when the dam was first built, because sedimentation has reduced the water volume. Interest in sediment removal began in the 1980s, after several major wildfires in the San Gabriel Mountains and subsequent flooding caused millions of cubic yards of sediment to wash into the reservoir. The reservoir was dewatered in 2004 to allow for sediment removal, but work was delayed after heavy rains during the winter of 2004–2005 refilled the reservoir.

Disposal of the removed sediment has been a contentious issue. Another option would have been to truck the sediment to local beaches for replenishment, but this has also been banned by the California Coastal Commission. Currently, most of the sediment is sold for building material or ends up as landfill, but these options are highly limited.

Flood control releases are coordinated in conjunction with the other mountain dams, Morris and Cogswell; and with Santa Fe and Whittier Narrows Dams on the lower San Gabriel River.

Power plant
The dam supports two small hydroelectric plants producing a maximum of 4.95 MW and owned by the Department of Public Works. Water from the reservoir can be bypassed through a tunnel called the Azusa Conduit to another power plant downstream of Morris Dam.  The power plant is located on the south side of the San Gabriel River directly below the mouth of San Gabriel Canyon. The original power plant was first built in 1898, by the San Gabriel Electric Company, and during its first few decades of operation powered electric railway lines in Los Angeles. At the time, this 2000 kilowatt (KW) plant drew water directly from the San Gabriel River. In 1917, the plant was sold to Southern California Edison, before being incorporated into the Pasadena municipal electric system. The completion of San Gabriel Dam in 1939 ensured a steadier water supply for the power plant, and in the late 1940s a new 3000 KW facility was built to replace the old one.

Trivia
The dam appears in the 2001 action/war film Behind Enemy Lines and is set in southern Bosnia.

See also
List of dams and reservoirs in California
List of lakes in California
List of the tallest dams in the United States

References

Los Angeles County Department of Public Works dams
Rock-filled dams
San Gabriel River (California)
San Gabriel Mountains
Angeles National Forest
Dams completed in 1939
1939 establishments in California